F.C. Atlas debuted the Apertura 2009 on July 25, 2009, with a 1-0 win over Pumas.

Summer transfers

In:

Out:

Current roster

Statistics

Goalkeepers

2009 Mexico Apertura

Atlas debuted the Apertura 2009 with a 1-0 victory over Pumas. Atlas showed a great performance in the first half. At the 45' minute marked the first goal of the game and season for Atlas, scored by Edgar Ivan Pacheco with a header, assisted by a long pass from Daniel Osorno. Apertura 2009 will be coached by Ricardo La Volpe.

Jornada 2, Atlas visited Monterrey. A poor performance by Atlas led them to lose to Monterrey 3-0. Goals scored by Monterrey were an own goal by Edgar Pacheco, Sergio Santana, and Humberto Suazo. Atlas' defense left many open spots in the defense which led Monterrey to shoot many shots. Canales was a huge factor in Monterrey's third, in which he came out and ended up leaving the goal, open.

Jornada 3, Atlas at home takes a 2-1 victory over Santos. Atlas with a much better improvements from last week. On Atlas' side, Ismael Fuentes scored the first on a corner, passed by Dario Botinelli. Gerardo Espinoza scored a very well goal. Dario Botinelli with a long pass for Daniel Osorno who makes a fast run for the ball and then re-passes the ball into the area where Espinoza gets the ball and shoots into the far angle of the goal. For Santos, Juan Carlos Mosqueda scored, but it wasn't enough for Atlas won.

Jornada 4, Atlas loses against the home team America. Atlas showed some poor performances on the defense. Now starting to show in need of a forward. Cabanas scored first for Club América with a very good goal, with errors by Hugo Ayala and Luis Robles. Atlas tied the game with a corner by Edgar Pacheco and Fuentes scores with a hard header and injures himself by bumping his head into Mosquera's head. Second Half, America again taking the lead. After a shot bounced off the crossbar, Beausejour picks up the ball and scores on Barbosa with a weak shot. Atlas had chances to score like a shot by Botinelli in which goalkeeper Guillermo Ochoa blocks and hits the crossbar. Another good opportunity by Pacheco which hits the crossbar as well.

Jornada 5, Atlas takes a loss at home against Morelia, 2-0. Sabah scored 2 goals for Morelia. Atlas, who showed great work on the field, but made few mistakes in which Morelia capitalized in.

Jornada 6, Atlas takes an away tie, 1-1 with Indios. It was a well-deserved result. Both sides gave their all and Pacheco scored a header, assisted by Mario Pérez. Indios scored a penalty, which was kicked by Edwin Santibanez.

Group standings

Top 3 goalscorers

References

2009
Atlas